Ghemon (born 1 April 1982) is an Italian rapper and singer-songwriter.

His stage name is a tribute to the character Ishikawa Goemon XIII from Monkey Punch's manga series Lupin the Third. His debut album La rivincita dei buoni was released in 2007. In 2017 his single "Adesso sono qui" was included in the soundtrack of the videogame NBA 2K17.

Ghemon participated at the Sanremo Music Festival 2019 with the song "Rose viola" and at the Sanremo Music Festival 2021 with "Momento perfetto".

Discography

Studio albums 
 La rivincita dei buoni (2007)
 E poi, all'improvviso, impazzire (2009)
 Qualcosa è cambiato - Qualcosa cambierà Vol. 2 (2012)
 Orchidee (2014)
 Mezzanotte (2017)
 Scritto nelle stelle (2020)
 E vissero feriti e contenti (2021)

References

Italian rappers
Living people
21st-century Italian male  singers
People from Avellino
1982 births